Edwin Coratti  (born 19 June 1991) is an Italian snowboarder.
 
He competed in the 2013 and 2015 FIS Snowboard World Championships, and in the 2018 Winter Olympics, in parallel giant slalom.

References

External links

1991 births
Living people
Italian male snowboarders
Olympic snowboarders of Italy
Snowboarders at the 2018 Winter Olympics
Snowboarders at the 2022 Winter Olympics
Snowboarders of Fiamme Oro
21st-century Italian people